The Uganda Retirement Benefits Regulatory Authority (URBRA) is a government-owned, semi-autonomous agency responsible for regulating, licensing, supervising, and controlling the retirement sector in Uganda, the third-largest economy in the East African Community. The authority is also responsible for issuing guidelines to allow the liberalization of the retirement sector in the country.

History
URBRA was established by an Act of Parliament of Uganda in 2011. The agency is under the Uganda Ministry of Finance and Economic Development but is semi-autonomous, with a governing board and a management team led by an executive director as the chief executive officer.

Before 2012, there were only two major retirement benefits plans in the country: the Public Employees Retirement Plan, for some civil servants, and the National Social Security Fund (Uganda), for privately employed people whose employers had at least five employees on payroll.

When URBRA was established, it was anticipated that new retirement benefits managers would be licensed and the sector would be liberalized and improved, with more choices and new retirement products introduced.

Licensed pension schemes
, URBRA, had licensed the following pension funds:

 National Social Security Fund
 Kampala City Traders Association Retirement Fund (Kacita Retirement Fund)
 Mazima Retirement Plan

See also
Bank of Uganda
Economy of Uganda
Insurance Regulatory Authority of Uganda
Uganda Revenue Authority

References

External links
Uganda Retirement Benefits Regulatory Authority Website
Ministry of Finance And Economic Development: Uganda Retirement Benefits Regulatory Authority
 NSSF holds 86% of all pension assets - report, as at December 2014: According to URBRA

Regulatory agencies of Uganda
Economy of Uganda
Retirement
Government agencies established in 2012
Organisations based in Kampala
2012 establishments in Uganda
Financial regulatory authorities